Panasonic Lumix DMC-GX1 is a micro four thirds camera which was announced 7 November 2011.

Features

The DMC-GX1 has a 16MP sensor with a top ISO of 12,800.  The 460,000 dot (480x320, HVGA) 3.0" fixed LCD functions as a touch screen.  The camera will create full AVCHD 1080/60i video from 30fps sensor output.  Continuous full resolution shooting is 4fps while burst mode allows continuous shooting up to 20fps at a lower resolution.  Extra function buttons were added bringing the total to four, two of which are on the touch screen.  Auto bracketing will create sets of 3, 5 or 7 exposures at 1/3, 2/3 or 1 stop.

References

External links

Panasonic Lumix DMC-GX1 Product Page

GX1